Neocollyris biimpressa is a species of ground beetle in the genus Neocollyris in the family Carabidae. It was described by Harn in 1937.

References

Biimpressa, Neocollyris
Beetles described in 1937